Mehdi Bozorgmehr (born in Tehran, Iran) is an Iranian musician and composer.

Biography
Mehdi Bozorgmehr was born in Tehran, Iran. He is a prolific composer of symphonic, choral, ensemble, arranger, children music, and film score. His current positions in Iran include: 
 A member of the Committee of Composers and Orchestra Leaders at the Khane Music (Iran's top music centre).
 A member and secretary of the Iranian Association of Film Composers at the Khane Cinema (Iran's top cinema centre)
 A member of the Academy of Iranian Cinema Referees at the Khane Cinema
He started music by playing piano and then took private classes with Kambiz Roshanravan, a renowned Iranian composer, learning music theories, harmony, Counterpoint, form, analysis, and composition. He professionally worked as a composer in 1993 and released five albums of rhymes and songs for children. He then worked as a composer with Tehran Symphony Orchestra, the national radio and television, movies, television series and animation.

Compositions  
Mehdi Bozorgmehr composes classical music, symphonies, quintets, quartets, trios, piano and ensemble for symphony orchestras. His works include:
 Symphony No 1 (Path of Fire)
 Suite Symphonic No 1 (Epic)
 Concerto for cello and orchestra (Shining)
 Concerto for flute and string orchestra (Green Lines)
 Concerto for piano and string orchestra (Flight)
 Concerto for violin and string orchestra (The First Love)
 String quartets No 1 and 2
12 pieces for piano and voice (Tale of thy Tress)
 Trio for violin, cello and piano
 Trio for flute, bassoon and harp
 Duets for cello and piano; violin and piano; clarinet and piano; flute and piano; piccolo and piano; soprano solo and piano
 Composing music for Iran's classic poetry such as that of Khayyam, Rumi, Bedil Dehlavi, Hafez, Saadi Shirazi and others.

Film and television scoring
 2009 – The Maryam's Report
 2005 – Internet Adventures
 2003 – Wild Sunflowers

Studio albums
 "Setareha Bidar Shin" Music for children's Institute for the Intellectual Development of Children and Young Adults
 "Madar" Music for children's (Institute for the Intellectual Development of Children and Young Adults)

Books
 "Symphony no. 5" (by : Ludwig van Beethoven) arrangement for piano, Part Publication.
 Tale of thy Trees (12 Pieces for voice and Piano) Chang Publication.

Awards
He has also attended in music festivals and won two composing prizes from The 13th Fajr International Music Festival, the country's top music competition, and The 2nd Mehr Music Festival.

References

External links
 
 
 Soureh Cinema
 Fandalism
 Mehdi Bozorgmehr page on Facebook

Living people
Iranian classical composers
Iranian film score composers
Iranian composers
Year of birth missing (living people)
Iranian music arrangers